Tercüman: Halka ve Olaylara was a Turkish daily newspaper. It was founded in 1955 by Kemal Ilıcak (1932–1993), and associated with the center-right. The newspaper closed after Ilıcak's death, and the name was acquired by the Çukurova Media Group in 1997.

In 2003 Ilıcak's family (including Kemal's son, Mehmet Ali Ilıcak) attempted to resurrect Tercüman, and a dispute with Çukurova over naming rights saw Çukurova hastily relaunch its Tercüman in January 2003, on the same day the Ilıcaks' Dünden Bugüne Tercüman appeared. Çukurova suffered during the financial crisis, and it closed down its Tercüman in 2010. Dünden Bugüne Tercüman was renamed Bugün in 2005.

References

Turkish-language newspapers
1955 establishments in Turkey
2010 disestablishments in Turkey
Newspapers established in 1955
Publications disestablished in 2010
Defunct newspapers published in Turkey
Daily newspapers published in Turkey
Nationalist newspapers
Newspapers published in Istanbul